Robert Bilott (born August 2, 1965) is an American environmental attorney from Cincinnati, Ohio. Bilott is known for the lawsuits against DuPont on behalf of plaintiffs injured by waste dumped in rural communities in West Virginia. Bilott has spent more than twenty years litigating hazardous dumping of the chemicals perfluorooctanoic acid (PFOA) and perfluorooctanesulfonic acid (PFOS).

Bilott's litigation was the foundation for a memoir titled Exposure: Poisoned Water, Corporate Greed, and One Lawyer's Twenty-Year Battle Against DuPont. He became of increasing media attention in the late 2010s and became more visible through the 2019 film  Dark Waters (2019 film) and 2018 documentary The Devil We Know which documented his legal battles with Dupont. This public attention led to a number of awards, including the international Right Livelihood Award.

Early life 
Bilott was born on August 2, 1965, in Albany, New York. Bilott's father served in the United States Air Force, and Bilott spent his childhood on several air force bases. Because the family moved frequently, Bilott attended eight different schools before graduating from Fairborn High School in Fairborn, Ohio. He then earned a Bachelor of Arts degree in political science and urban studies from the New College of Florida. He then earned a Juris Doctor from the Ohio State University Moritz College of Law in 1990.

Career 
Bilott was admitted to the bar in 1990 and began his law practice at Taft Stettinius & Hollister LLP in Cincinnati, Ohio For eight years he worked almost exclusively for large corporate clients and his specialty was defending chemical companies. He became a partner at the firm in 1998.

Initial actions against DuPont 
Bilott represented Wilbur Tennant of Parkersburg, West Virginia whose cattle were dying. The farm was downstream from a landfill where DuPont had been dumping hundreds of tons of perfluorooctanoic acid. In the summer of 1999, Bilott filed a federal suit against DuPont in the United States District Court for the Southern District of West Virginia. In response, DuPont advised that DuPont and the United States Environmental Protection Agency would commission a study of the farmer's property, conducted by three veterinarians chosen by DuPont and three chosen by the Environmental Protection Agency. When the report was released, it blamed the Tennants for the dying cattle claiming that poor husbandry was responsible: "poor nutrition, inadequate veterinary care and lack of fly control." 

After Bilott discovered that thousands of tons of DuPont's PFOA had been dumped into the landfill next to the Tennants' property and that DuPont's PFOA was contaminating the surrounding community's water supply, DuPont settled the Tennants' case. In August 2001, Bilott filed a class action lawsuit against DuPont on behalf of the approximately 70,000 people in West Virginia and Ohio with PFOA-contaminated drinking water, which was settled in September 2004, with class benefits valued at over $300 million, including DuPont agreeing to install filtration plants in the six affected water districts and dozens of impacted private wells, a cash award of $70 million, and provisions for future medical monitoring to be paid by DuPont up to $235 million, if an independent science panel confirmed "probable links" between PFOA in the drinking water and human disease. 

After the independent scientific panel jointly selected by the parties (but required under the settlement to be paid for by DuPont) found that there was a probable link between drinking PFOA and kidney cancer, testicular cancer, thyroid disease, high cholesterol, pre-eclampsia, and ulcerative colitis, Bilott began opening individual personal-injury lawsuits against DuPont on behalf of affected users of the Ohio and West Virginia water supplies, which by 2015 numbered over 3,500. After losing the first three for $19.7 million, in 2017 DuPont agreed to settle the remainder of the then-pending cases for $671.7 million. Dozens of additional cases filed after the 2017 settlement were settled in 2021 for an additional $83 million (announced in conjunction with a $4 billion settlement between DuPont and its spin-off, Chemours, over PFAS liabilities), bringing the total settlement value in the personal injury cases for those exposed to PFOA in their drinking water to over $753 million.

Subsequent actions 
In 2018, Bilott filed a new case seeking new studies and testing of the larger group of PFAS chemicals on behalf of a proposed nationwide class of everyone in the United States who has PFAS chemicals in their blood, against several PFAS manufacturers, including 3M, DuPont, and Chemours. This new litigation is ongoing . In March 2022, the federal court overseeing the case certified the case to proceed as a class action on behalf of millions of people with PFAS in their blood.

Media notice 
In 2016, Bilott's story was the focus of a featured cover story by Nathaniel Rich in the New York Times Magazine, entitled, "The Lawyer Who Became DuPont's Worst Nightmare." Rich's story was later published in his book, Second Nature (2021). Bilott's work was also featured in extensive articles in The Huffington Post ("Welcome to Beautiful Parkersburg") and The Intercept (multi-part The Teflon Toxin series). 

Robert Bilott is the author of the acclaimed memoir Exposure: Poisoned Water, Corporate Greed, and One Lawyer's Twenty-Year Battle Against DuPont, published in 2019 by Atria Books. The audio book version is narrated by Jeremy Bobb with the first chapter narrated by Mark Ruffalo. Bilott's story also became the basis for Dark Waters, a 2019 film starring Mark Ruffalo as Bilott, and Anne Hathaway as Bilott's wife, Sarah Barlage. The story is also featured in the feature-length documentary The Devil We Know; the Swedish documentary, The Toxic Compromise; was the subject of the poem, Watershed by U.S. Poet Laureate Tracy K. Smith; is the subject of the "Toxic Waters" episode of the multi-part feature documentary, Parched, which aired on the National Geographic TV channel in 2017.  

He is also the subject for the song and video "Deep in the Water" by The Gary Douglas Band, and the song "Blank" / "Worker" by emo revival band The World Is a Beautiful Place & I Am No Longer Afraid to Die. He also appears in Devil Put The Coal In The Ground, a 2022 documentary about the suffering and devastation brought on by the coal industry and its decline. Bilott also authored the foreword of the book Forever Chemicals Environmental, Economic, and Social Equity Concerns with PFAS in the Environment, published in 2021 by CRC Press. He also appears in the film released in 2023 entitled, Burned: Protecting the Protectors, which focuses on PFAS exposures among firefighters.

Accolades 
In 2017, Bilott received the international Right Livelihood Award, also known as the "Alternative Nobel Prize," for his decades of work on PFAS chemical contamination issues, and was featured on a stamp issued in Austria, commemorating the award.

In 2020, Bilott was part of a “Fight Forever Chemicals” social media and outreach campaign that was a Winner in Entertainment and a Finalist in Global Campaign, Media Partnership for the social media Shorty Awards. “Fight Forever Chemicals” also received a Gold Distinction in Environment and Sustainability.

Bilott serves on the board of directors for Less Cancer, the board of trustees for Green Umbrella, and served on the alumni board for New College of Florida from 2018-2021. In 2021, Bilott received an Honorary Doctor of Laws Degree from New College of Florida and an Honorary Doctor of Science Degree from The Ohio State University's Environmental Science Graduate Program. 

He is also a fellow in the Right Livelihood College, an Honorary Professor at the National University of Cordoba in Argentina, and a lecturer at the Yale School of Public Health, Department of Environmental Health Sciences.

Awards and recognition 
2005Trial Lawyer of the Year. Presented by The Trial Lawyers For Public Justice Foundation.
2006Super Lawyer Rising Star. Selected by Cincinnati Magazine.
2008100 Top Trial Lawyers from Ohio. Named by American Trial Lawyers Association.
2008Present Leading Lawyer Honoree. Name by Cincy Magazine Environmental Law. 
2010Present Honoree, Environmental Law, Litigation. Named by Best Lawyers in America. 
2011Present Top Local Plaintiff Litigation Star Honoree. Presented by Benchmark Plaintiff. 
2014Clarence Darrow Award Honoree. Presented by Mass Tort Bar. 
2016Giraffe Hero Commendation Honoree. Presented by Giraffe Heroes Project. 
2016Joined the board of the Next Generation Choices Foundation (a.k.a. Less Cancer) "to support its mission in championing education and policy that will help prevent cancer."
2017Present Class Action Honoree. Presented by Kentucky Super Lawyers.
2017Right Livelihood Award. Presented by The Right Livelihood Foundation (December 1, 2017).
2017MVP for Class Action Honoree. Named by Law360.
2019Lawyer of the Year in LitigationEnvironmental. Named by Best Lawyers.
2020Public Interest Environmental Law David Brower Lifetime Achievement Award.
2020Kentucky Bar Association Distinguished Lawyer Award.
2020Big Fish Award. Presented by Riverkeeper Fishermen's Ball.
2020Consumer Safety Award. Presented by the Kentucky Justice Association. 
2021Lawyer of the Year in LitigationEnvironmental. Named by Best Lawyers.
2021Honorary Doctor of Laws Degree from New College of Florida.
2022Lawyer of the Year in Environmental LawCincinnati. Named by Best Lawyers.

Personal life 
In 1996, Bilott married Sarah Barlage. They have three children, Teddy, Charlie and Tony.

References

External links 
 Exposure at simonandschuster.com
 Exposure at kirkusreviews.com
 Robert Bilott at osu.edu
 Robert Bilott at theintercept.com

Living people
20th-century American lawyers
1965 births
American environmental lawyers
21st-century American lawyers
Ohio State University Moritz College of Law alumni
Lawyers from Albany, New York
Lawyers from Cincinnati
New College of Florida alumni